Erora is a genus of butterflies in the family Lycaenidae erected by Samuel Hubbard Scudder in 1872. The species of this genus are found in the Nearctic and Neotropical realms.

Species
Erora laeta (Edwards, 1862) – early hairstreak
Erora quaderna (Hewitson, 1868) – Arizona hairstreak
Erora subflorens (Schaus, 1913)
Erora biblia (Hewitson, 1868)
Erora nitetis (Godman & Salvin, [1887])
Erora aura (Godman & Salvin, [1887])
Erora tella (Schaus, 1902)
Erora phrosine (Druce, 1909)
Erora carla (Schaus, 1902)
Erora gabina (Godman & Salvin, [1887])
Erora opisena (Druce, 1912)
Erora campa (E. D. Jones, 1912)
Erora badeta (Hewitson, 1873)
Erora muridosca (Dyar, 1918)
Erora lampetia (Godman & Salvin, [1887])
Erora facuna (Hewitson, 1877)
Erora senta (Draudt, 1920)
Erora caespes (Druce, 1907)
Erora melba (Hewitson, 1877)
Erora nana (C. Felder & R. Felder, 1865)
Erora lorina (Hewitson, 1874)

References

Eumaeini
Lycaenidae of South America
Lycaenidae genera
Taxa named by Samuel Hubbard Scudder